B Positive is an American television sitcom created by Marco Pennette, who is also the show's executive producer along with Chuck Lorre for Chuck Lorre Productions and Warner Bros. Television. The multicamera series premiered on CBS on November 5, 2020 as a Thursday-night entry in the 2020–21 television season.

In May 2021, the series was renewed for a second and final season, which premiered on October 14, 2021. In May 2022, the series was canceled after two seasons.

Premise
The series initially follows Drew, a therapist and newly divorced father with B-positive blood who needs a kidney donor. When he is unable to find a donor within his family, a woman from his past named Gina offers him one of her kidneys.

Following Drew's successful transplant surgery, the Season 2 focus shifts to Gina, who inherits a large sum of money and buys the retirement home where she works, while Drew reassesses his life goals and sets out to rediscover himself.

The sitcom is inspired by the true story of series creator Marco Pennette, who received a kidney transplant in 2013.

Cast

Main
 Thomas Middleditch as Drew Dunbar, a divorced father and therapist in need of a kidney transplant and a social life
 Annaleigh Ashford as Gina Dabrowski, a former acquaintance of Drew's from high school who becomes his kidney donor, as her blood is an incredibly rare match for his. Gina initially works as a van driver for the Valley Hills assisted living facility. In season 2, she receives a surprise inheritance from one of the elderly residents, and decides to buy the retirement home.
 Kether Donohue as Gabby, Gina's best friend, a party girl who works with her in the Valley Hills assisted living facility
 Sara Rue as Julia Dunbar (season 1; guest season 2), Drew's ex-wife, a realtor who aspires to climb the social ladder; her frustrations with trying to get Drew to embrace her interests more led to her having an affair that resulted in their split
 Izzy G as Madeline "Maddie" Dunbar (season 1; guest season 2), Drew and Julia's teenage daughter
 Terrence Terrell as Eli Russell (season 1; recurring season 2), a retired football player with an upbeat personality whom Drew meets during dialysis treatment
 David Anthony Higgins as Jerry Platt (season 2; recurring season 1), a divorced dentist who has been in dialysis for over a year. He always sees the glass half-empty, convinced he'll never find a donor; when he does, his body ends up rejecting the donated kidney. In season 2, he falls due to a heart-related incident, and moves into Valley Hills to recover.
 Darryl Stephens as Gideon (season 2; recurring season 1), an empathetic gay nurse who works at the dialysis center. He cares deeply about the people to whom he gives treatment, often getting involved in their personal lives. There is a recurring theme of Gideon referring to himself in the third-person. In season 2, he becomes head nurse at Valley Hills.
 Linda Lavin as Norma Goldman (season 2; recurring season 1), one of the senior citizens at Valley Hills assisted living facility. She has a maternal, nurturing relationship with Gina, but she can be fairly randy, irresponsible, and demanding. Part of her close bond with Gina stems from the sad fact that Norma and her daughter (mentioned but not seen on the show) are estranged from each other.

Recurring
 Briga Heelan as Samantha Turner (season 1), an uptight, intense millennial in Drew's dialysis group who does not suffer fools. She is angry about her illness and often takes it out on those around her, but she is ultimately a good-hearted person. She is trying not to let dialysis get in the way of her climbing the corporate ladder. She tells her colleagues that her mother has cancer in order to have an excuse to leave work for dialysis appointments, revealing that if her workmates knew about her kidney failure, it would kill her career "faster than being pregnant."
 Bernie Kopell as Mr. Knudsen (season 1), one of the senior citizens at the Valley Hills assisted living facility. He dies off-screen in the season 2 premiere, leaving millions of dollars for Gina in his will.
 Jason Kravits as Dr. Baskin, Drew's nephrologist
 Adam Chambers as Paul (season 1), one of Gina's friends
 Rosa Salazar (season 1) and Michelle Ortiz (season 2) as Adriana, Drew's ex-girlfriend who has cancer; she leaves him when she learns of his feelings for Gina
 Anna Maria Horsford as Althea Ludlum (season 2), the sarcastic and grumpy administrator of Valley Hills
 Héctor Elizondo as Harry Milton (season 2), a resident at Valley Hills, who spends all of his time and energy trying to keep his terminally-ill wife, Meredith, comfortable. After Meredith's death, he decides to travel down the road with Drew in the camper van.
 Jane Seymour as Bette (season 2), an aging beauty who is incapable of coming to terms with her senior status
 Ben Vereen as Peter Morgan (season 2), a brilliant, retired professor who is facing (and trying to hide) his rapidly fading memory
 Jim Beaver as Spencer Williams (season 2), former NYPD transit cop who was a 9/11 first responder. Politically and socially, he finds it difficult to behave appropriately; he is attracted to Bette but usually just grosses her out with sexist comments.
 D.B. Sweeney as Bert (season 2), a laughably incompetent cook at the Valley Hills
 Priscilla Lopez as Meredith Milton (season 2), a resident at Valley Hills who was dealing with her terminal illness as best as she could while trying to help her husband, Harry, move on. She succumbs to her cancer after a romantic Parisian-themed date with Harry.

Guest starring
 Tim Bagley as Minister (season 1)
 Jessica Tuck as Dr. Goodson (season 1)
 Jessica Lundy as Charlene (season 1), Gina's stepmother
 Melissa Tang as Megyn (season 1), a patient who occupies Samantha's chair while she is out of town
 Ernie Grunwald as Mr. Kafkaman (season 2)
 George Wyner as Bill (season 2), Gina's inheritance attorney
 Johnathan McClain as Mark (season 2), a magician that Gina hires to entertain the residents
 Katie Finneran as Natalie (season 2), Gina's older sister
 Anthony Montgomery as Kyle (season 2), Peter's son
 Rondi Reed as Irene (season 2), Norma's rude sister, who moves to Valley Hills
 Ryan Cartwright as Asher (season 2), the regional director of Golden Horizons, the rival retirement home of Valley Hills

Episodes

Series overview

Season 1 (2020–21)

Season 2 (2021–22)

Production

Development
The series was among the 14 pilots ordered by CBS in February 2020 and was fast tracked to series the following March, as the pilot had already been completed before production at Warner Bros. Television was suspended due to the COVID-19 pandemic. The pilot was the only pilot completed for the 2020–21 television season for any of the broadcast networks in advance of the upfronts. On May 8, 2020, CBS picked up the series, and CTV followed soon after, picking up the series on June 23, 2020. On October 26, 2020, Jim Patterson joined the series as an executive producer and co-showrunner. The series premiered on November 5, 2020. On December 21, 2020, CBS gave the series a five-episode back order, making the total number of episodes ordered to 18. On May 15, 2021, CBS renewed the series for a second and final season which premiered on October 14, 2021. On October 15, 2021, it was reported that creator and co-showrunner Marco Pennette had left the series at the end of the first season and Patterson would continue to serve as showrunner for the second season. On May 12, 2022, CBS canceled the series after two seasons.

Casting
On February 19, 2020, it was announced that Annaleigh Ashford had been cast in the pilot. On March 2, 2020, it was announced that Kether Donohue and Sara Rue had joined the cast. The following day, it was announced that Thomas Middleditch had joined the cast in the lead role. Alongside the series picked up announcement, it was reported that Kamryn Kunody was cast in a starring role. On August 11, 2020, Maggie Elizabeth Jones joined the cast in a recasting, replacing Kunody. On September 25, 2020, Terrence Terrell was cast as a series regular. On October 12, 2020, Izzy G was cast to replace Jones in a second recasting while Linda Lavin, Briga Heelan, Darryl Stephens, Bernie Kopell, and David Anthony Higgins were cast in recurring roles and Darien Sills-Evans was cast to guest star. On September 1, 2021, Lavin, Higgins, and Stephens were promoted to series regulars while Hector Elizondo, Jane Seymour, Ben Vereen, Celia Weston, Jim Beaver, and Anna Maria Horsford joined cast in recurring roles for the second season. Weston was to play the character of Meredith, but the role was recast with Priscilla Lopez in the role. On October 5, 2021, it was reported that Michelle Ortiz joined the cast in a recasting, replacing Rosa Salazar for the second season. On October 27, 2021, it was announced that D.B. Sweeney was cast in a recurring role for the second season.

Filming 
Production for the first season concluded on April 16, 2021.

Reception

Critical response
On Rotten Tomatoes, the series holds an approval rating of 84% with an average rating of 5.8/10, based on 19 reviews. The website's critics consensus states, "B Positive familiar sitcom trappings are elevated by its charming cast—especially the weird and winsome comedic stylings of Tony winner Annaleigh Ashford." On Metacritic, it has a weighted average score of 62 out of 100, based on 14 critics, indicating "generally favorable reviews".

Ratings

Overall

Season 1

Season 2

References

External links 
 

2020 American television series debuts
2022 American television series endings
2020s American medical television series
2020s American romantic comedy television series
2020s American sitcoms
CBS original programming
English-language television shows
Organ transplantation in fiction
Television productions postponed due to the COVID-19 pandemic
Television series about families
Television series based on actual events
Television series by Warner Bros. Television Studios
Television shows about diseases and disorders
Television shows set in Connecticut